Deirdre Jacob is an Irish woman who disappeared near her home in Newbridge, County Kildare on 28 July 1998 at the age of 18. In August 2018 the Garda Síochána announced that her disappearance was being treated as a murder case.

Family
Her parents are Michael and Bernadette Jacob and she was born on 14 October 1979.

At the time of her disappearance, she had completed her first year as a student teacher at St Mary's University, Twickenham, London.

Disappearance
Deirdre was last seen about 3pm on 28 July 1998. She had gone to the Newbridge branch of Allied Irish Banks to get a bank draft to pay for student accommodation at the university, then went to the post office to post the bank draft. She also visited her grandmother, who owned a shop.

The last sighting of her was close to her house on Barretstown Road.

At the time of her disappearance she wore a dark T-shirt with white shoes and was carrying a black bag with a yellow Caterpillar Inc logo. The bag has never been found.

Aftermath
Deirdre's parents have never been able to move on and still hope that someone with information regarding their daughter's disappearance will come forward. They have appealed to the public for information several times over the years.

In 2016 her parents said that there was not as strong a link between their daughter's disappearance and convicted rapist Larry Murphy as was often supposed. Gardaí were never able to place Murphy in Newbridge the day she disappeared. The only connection found was a piece of paper with Larry Murphy's name and phone number among the belongings of Deirdre's maternal grandmother after the latter's death. She had owned a shop in Newbridge and Murphy had left his contact details with her grandmother as he was making wooden children's toys, but this was years before Deirdre's disappearance.

In July 2018, on the 20th anniversary of her disappearance, her father called for a dedicated missing-persons unit to be set up. Her parents were satisfied that the Gardaí in Kildare were doing everything possible to locate their daughter, but that a dedicated unit would help investigations into missing persons cases.

By 2018 Gardaí had conducted 3,200 lines of inquiry and taken 2,500 witness statements.

Case upgraded to murder investigation
In 2018 the case was reclassified as a murder enquiry because of new information and a review of the case. Although Gardaí did not reveal the new information, they said there was a definite line of inquiry.
In October 2018 Gardaí stated that they had 'significant' new leads in the murder probe and identified Larry Murphy as 'a person of interest'. Jacob’s family still live in Newbridge and although they knew the reclassification of her disappearance as murder was to happen they still found it heart-wrenching and shattering to hear the language of a murder investigation used about their daughter's disappearance.

Search on Kildare-Wicklow border
In October 2021 Gardaí began searching woodland near Usk Little on the Kildare/Wicklow border. The search was begun after a review of evidence and involved as many as 15 people, from the Garda Technical Bureau as well as a forensic archaeologist. The area is about three acres and the search took three weeks, but they did not find any remains; however, an ancient settlement from around 500 BC was unearthed.

July 2022: "no prosecution"
The Garda Síochána submitted a criminal file to the Director of Public Prosecutions (DPP) in 2021. However, on 16 July 2022 it was reported that the DPP had returned the file with a direction of "no prosecution".

See also
 Lists of people who disappeared
 Ireland's Vanishing Triangle

References

1979 births
1990s missing person cases
July 1998 events in Europe
Missing person cases in Ireland
Unsolved murders in Ireland
1998 murders in the Republic of Ireland
Year of death missing
Newbridge, County Kildare
History of County Kildare